The 2022 Tour of Szeklerland was the 16th edition of the Tour of Szeklerland, which took place between 8 and 13 August 2022. It was rated as a 2.2 event as part of the 2022 UCI Europe Tour.

Teams
Ten UCI Continental teams, seven domestic and regional teams, and two national team made up the eighteen teams that participated in the race, with six riders each. With five riders, Tzar Simeon Plovdiv is the only team to not field a maximum roster of six riders.

Route

Stages

Stage 1

9 August 2022 Debrecen to Debrecen (Hungary)

Stage 2
10 August 2022 — Târgu Mureș to Miercurea Ciuc,

Stage 3
11 August 2022 — Miercurea Ciuc to Sfântu Gheorghe,

Stage 4
12 August 2022 — Sfântu Gheorghe to Harghita-Băi,

Stage 5
13 August 2022 — Odorheiu Secuiesc to Miercurea Ciuc,

Classification leadership table

 On stage 2, Filip Prokopyszyn, who was second in the points classification, wore the green jersey, because first-placed Nicolas Dalla Valle wore the yellow jersey as the leader of the general classification.

Final classification standings

General classification

Points classification

Mountains classification

Young rider classification

Team classification

See also

 2022 in men's road cycling
 2022 in sports

References

External links

Tour of Szeklerland
Tour of Szeklerland